Fenton is a hamlet in Nottinghamshire, England. Population details are included in the civil parish of Sturton le Steeple.

External links

Hamlets in Nottinghamshire
Bassetlaw District